The Portland United Methodist Church is a historic church building at 300 N. Main St. in Portland, Arkansas  The Craftsman style two story T-shaped building was built in 1924 to a design by architect John Parks Almand.  The building is faced in brick laid in a running bond pattern.  The roof is ceramic tile, with broad overhanging eaves supported by distinctive triangular knee braces.  The building is the largest and most prominent building in Portland's small downtown area.

The church was listed on the National Register of Historic Places in 2006.

See also
National Register of Historic Places listings in Ashley County, Arkansas

References

Churches on the National Register of Historic Places in Arkansas
Churches completed in 1924
Churches in Ashley County, Arkansas
National Register of Historic Places in Ashley County, Arkansas
1924 establishments in Arkansas
Bungalow architecture in Arkansas
American Craftsman architecture in Arkansas